Glisy is a commune in the Somme department in Hauts-de-France in northern France.

Geography
Amiens airport is within the boundaries of the village. It was used as a military base by the occupying German forces between 1940 and 1944.

Population

See also
Communes of the Somme department

References

Communes of Somme (department)